Future Classic is an Australian independent record label, artist management team, touring agency, and music publisher that was founded in 2004.

The label's current roster includes Flume, Flight Facilities, Ta-ku, Jagwar Ma, Seekae, Panama, Hayden James, Basenji, Jonti, Wafia, Touch Sensitive, Bus Vipers, and more.

Current artists

  Basenji
  Buzzy Lee
  Christopher Port
  Classixx
  Ebhoni
  Ela Minus
  Eric J
  Flight Facilities
  Flume
  G Flip
  Hayden James
  Jagwar Ma
  Jonti
  Panama
  Seekae
  Sycco
  Ta-ku
  Thrupence
  Touch Sensitive
  Wafia

Touring artists

See also 
 List of record labels

References 

Record labels established in 2004
Australian independent record labels
Indie rock record labels
Electronic music record labels